Mad Dogs and Englishmen is a 1995 British thriller film directed by Henry Cole and starring Elizabeth Hurley, C. Thomas Howell and Joss Ackland. The screenplay concerns an upper-class drug addict pursued by the criminal underworld.

Plot

Antonia Dyer is a well-to-do Englishwoman with a serious drug habit. Her heroin supply is delivered by an American motorcycle courier named Mike Stone, and before long the two of them also develop a romantic attachment.

Not only does Antonia risk her life with drug use, but she is physically assaulted by a deranged police inspector named Stringer who has a particular distaste for high-society addicts. Stringer also has two dangerous thugs who work on the side for Tony Vernon-Smith, a drug lord, further putting Antonia's life in jeopardy.

Cast
 Elizabeth Hurley ...  Antonia Dyer
 C. Thomas Howell ...  Mike 
 Joss Ackland ...  Inspector Sam Stringer 
 Christopher Adamson ...  Max Quinlan
 Marcus Bentley ...  Photographer's Assistant 
 Claire Bloom ...  Liz Stringer
 Jeremy Brett ...  Tony Vernon-Smith 
 Russ Kane ...  Flying Eye Reporter 
 Andrew Connolly ...  Clive Nathan 
 Louise Delamere ...  Sandy 
 Cheryl Doll ...  Young Antonia 
 Nicola Duffett ...  Diane 
 Alan Freeman ...  Disc Jockey 
 Paula Hamilton ...  Charlie 
 David Harewood ...  Jessop 
 Ian Henderson ...  Surveillance Detective 
 Daniel Jenkins ...  Junkie 
 Patrick Lichfield ...  Himself 
 Frederick Treves ...  Sir Harry Dyer

References

External links

1995 films
1990s thriller films
British thriller films
Films about drugs
1990s English-language films
1990s British films